Julia Niewiarowska-Brzozowska (1827–1891) was a Polish Romantic era composer. She was born in Warsaw.

References

External links
 Scores by Julia Niewiarowska-Brzozowska in digital library Polona

1827 births
1891 deaths
19th-century classical composers
Polish composers
Women classical composers
Musicians from Warsaw
19th-century women composers
Polish women composers